Xiqu may refer to:

Chinese opera (Xìqǔ)

Places in China
Xi District (Xīqū), a district of Panzhihua, Sichuan
Xiqu Subdistrict, Zhongshan, a subdistrict of Zhongshan, Guangdong
Xiqu Subdistrict, Gujiao, a subdistrict of Gujiao, Shanxi
Xiqu, Gansu, a town in Minqin County, Gansu

Places in Taiwan
West District, Chiayi (Xīqū)
West District, Taichung (Xīqū)

See also
West District (disambiguation)